Franco Citti (23 April 1935 – 14 January 2016) was an Italian actor, best known as one of the close collaborators of director Pier Paolo Pasolini. He came to fame for playing the title role in Pasolini's film Accattone, which brought him a BAFTA Award nomination for Best Foreign Actor. He subsequently starred in six of Pasolini's films, as well as 60 other film and television roles. His brother was the director and screenwriter Sergio Citti.

Biography 
Citti was born in Fiumicino in 1935 and was raised with his older brother Sergio Citti, working as a painter and day laborer. At the age of 26, he was discovered by Pier Paolo Pasolini, who appreciated his distinctly Roman features, and cast him in the title role of his 1961 directorial debut Accattone. Citti lead a cast of other non-professional actors, and proved the breakthrough of the cast, earning a BAFTA Award nomination for a Best Foreign Actor, as well as a nomination for a Nastro d'Argento for Best Actor.

Pasolini subsequently cast him in six of his subsequent films, becoming one of the filmmaker's close creative collaborators. He played Carmine, opposite Anna Magnani, in Mamma Roma (1962), the title character in Oedipus Rex (1967), a cannibal in Pigsty (1969), Ser Ciappelletto in The Decameron (1971), Satan in The Canterbury Tales (1972), and the Demon in Arabian Nights (1974). He appeared in Laura Betti's 2002 documentary Pier Paolo Pasolini e la ragione di un sogno, in which he discussed his working relationship with Pasolini.

Citrti also worked with such notable filmmakers as Sergio Corbucci, Carlo Lizzani, Valerio Zurlini, and Bernardo Bertolucci. He appeared in a number of films directed by his brother Sergio, and co-directed with him the 1998 film Cartoni animati. To non-Italian audiences, Citti is perhaps best known for his role as Sicilian bodyguard Calò in The Godfather and The Godfather: Part III, uttering the memorable line "In Sicily, women are more dangerous than shotguns."

He died in Rome on 14 January 2016, at the age of 80, after a long illness.

Filmography 

Accattone (1961) (Pier Paolo Pasolini) - Vittorio "Accattone" Cataldi
Una vita violenta (1962) - Tommaso
Mamma Roma (1962) (Pier Paolo Pasolini)
The Shortest Day (1963) (Sergio Corbucci) - Fante Romano
Du mouron pour les petits oiseaux (1963) (Marcel Carné) - Renato
Requiescant (1967) (Carlo Lizzani) - Burt
Edipo Re (1967) (Pier Paolo Pasolini) - Edipo
Seduto alla sua destra (1968) (Valerio Zurlini) - Oreste
Kill Them All and Come Back Alone (1968) (Enzo G. Castellari) - Hoagy
Il magnaccio (1969) (Franco De Rosis)
La legge dei gangsters (1969) - Bruno Esposito
Pigsty (1969) (Pier Paolo Pasolini) - Cannibal
Una ragazza di Praga (1969) (Sergio Pastore) - Alberto Marini
Gli angeli del 2000 (1969) - Franco
Ostia (1970) (Sergio Citti) - Rabbino
The Decameron (1971) (Pier Paolo Pasolini) - Ciappelletto
La primera entrega (1971)
The Godfather (1972) (Francis Ford Coppola) - Calò - Sicilian Sequence
I racconti di Canterbury (1972) (Pier Paolo Pasolini) - The Devil
Storie scellerate (1973) (Sergio Citti) - Artemio
Storia de fratelli e de cortelli (1974) (Mario Amendola) - Artemio
Ingrid sulla strada (1973) (Brunello Rondi) - Renato
Giuda uccide il venerdì (1974)
Il fiore delle mille e una notte (1974) (Pier Paolo Pasolini) - The Demon
Chi dice donna dice donna (1976) (Tonino Cervi) - Benito (segment "La signorina X")
Colpita da improvviso benessere (1976) (Franco Giraldi) - Luiso Malerba
Uomini si nasce poliziotti si muore (1976) (Ruggero Deodato) - Rudy
Todo modo (1976) (Elio Petri) - Autista di M.
Rome: The Other Side of Violence (1976) (Marino Girolami) - Berte
Puttana galera! (1976) (Gianfranco Piccioli) - Ciro
Destruction Force (1977) (Stelvio Massi) - Antonio Lanza
Il gatto dagli occhi di giada (1977) (Antonio Bido) - Pasquale Ferrante
Casotto (1977) (Sergio Citti) - Nando
La luna (1979) (Bernardo Bertolucci) - Man in Bar
L'albero della maldicenza (1979) (Giacinto Bonacquisti) - Angelo Maria
Ciao marziano (1980) (Pier Francesco Pingitore) - Er Cinese
Eroina (1980) (Massimo Pirri) - Alfredo, il 'Sceriffo'
Il minestrone (1981) (Sergio Citti) - Francesco
Pè sempe (1982)
The Black Stallion Returns (1983) (Robert Dalva) - Foreign Legion Officer
The Malady of Love (1986) (Giorgio Treves) - Cigal
Rosso di sera (1988) (Beppe Cino) - Franco
Kafka la colonia penale (1988)
The Secret (1990) - Franco
The Godfather: Part III (1990) (Francis Ford Coppola) - Calò
Appuntamento in nero (1990) - Projectionist
El infierno prometido (1992) - Caronte
Power and Lovers (1994) - Michele
I magi randagi (1996) (Sergio Citti)
Festival (1996) (Pupi Avati)
Il sindaco (1996) (Antonio Avati)
Cartoni animati (1997) (Franco Citti and Sergio Citti) - Peppe
E insieme vivremo tutte le stagioni (1999) (Gianni Minello) - (final film role)
Pier Paolo Pasolini e la ragione di un sogno (2002) (Laura Betti) - Himself

Awards and nominations 
Avellino Neorealism Film Festival

 Special Mention (Accattone)

British Academy Film Award 

 Best Foreign Actor (Accattone)

Nastro d'Argento 

 Best Actor (Accattone)

References

External links 

1935 births
2016 deaths
Italian male film actors
Italian male stage actors
Italian male television actors
People of Lazian descent